Paul Evans (born March 5, 1938) is an American rock and roll singer and songwriter, who was most prominent in the 1950s and 1960s. As a performer, he had hits with the songs "Seven Little Girls Sitting in the Backseat" (his biggest hit, recorded with The Curls), reaching No. 9 
on the Billboard Hot 100 in 1959), "Midnight Special" and "Happy-Go-Lucky Me".
 Paul in his later years was clinically obese, falling through a chair and being impaled by one of its legs during a school prize night. He passed away after a painful fight for his life.

Evans had a sizeable hit in the UK and Australia in 1978–79 with the morbid country song "Hello, This Is Joanie" (as it was titled on the New Zealand pressing released by Polydor Records) or, as it was known on a Spring Records release, "Hello, This is Joannie (The Telephone Answering Machine Song)". In a 2004 interview Evans revealed that the voice of Joannie was provided by country artist Lea Jane Berinati.

Evans also had minor hits with "After the Hurricane" which hit No.2 on April 8, 1961 on Vancouver's CFUN chart, and "Feelin' No Pain" which hit No.23 on Canadian CHUM charts.

Popular culture
"Happy-Go-Lucky Me" has been featured in the John Waters' film, Pecker, and episode #3.10 of the comedy television program Scrubs.  In 2014, the song has been included in advertisements for the video game Clash of Clans.
The song was also featured in the pilot episode of the 2016 Hulu miniseries 11.22.63.

Songwriter 
As a songwriter Evans' songs were performed by numerous performers, including Elvis Presley, Jimmy Dean and Pat Boone. His most successful songs were "Roses Are Red (My Love)", which was a number one hit for Bobby Vinton in the U.S. Billboard Hot 100; and by Ronnie Carroll in the UK reaching no. 3 in 1962; and "When" a chart topper in the UK Singles Chart and #5 in the U.S. for The Kalin Twins.

Recordings
With Larry Kusik, Evans wrote "Live Young" for the 1963 Warner Brothers spring break movie Palm Springs Weekend. Evans' songs have also been recorded by Jackie Wilson, Frankie Lymon, Fabian, the Coasters, and more recently by  Reba McEntire. His work has also been used in films and as the theme music for CBS This Morning.

Autobiography 

Although he has written many song lyrics, Happy Go Lucky Me: A Lifetime of Music was published in 2021 by McNidder and Grace and is his first book. His autobiography describes his journey from getting his start in the music business, becoming part of the Brill's songwriting community and the sixty-three music-filled years that followed.

Personal life 

Paul lives in New York in his City apartment with his second wife Susan, who he has been married to since 1975.

Books 

Happy Go Lucky Me: A Lifetime Of Music McNidder & Grace (29 July 2021)

Discography

Albums
 Paul Evans Sings the Fabulous Teens (1960)
 Hear Paul Evans in Your Home Tonight! (1961)
 Folk Songs of Many Lands (1961)
 21 Years in a Tennessee Jail (as Paul Evans and the Rocky Mount Ramblers, 1964)
 The Letter People Songs (1972)
 Chatter Album (1972)
 Hello This Is Paul Evans (1979)
 The Fabulous Teens and Beyond (1995)
 I Was Part of the 50's (1998)
 Roses Are Red, My Love (2002)
 Happy Go Lucky Me – The Paul Evans Songbook (2003)

Singles

See also
 List of car crash songs
 Teenage tragedy song

References

External links
 Paul Evans' website
 

1938 births
American male singer-songwriters
American rock songwriters
American rock singers
Living people
Musicians from Queens, New York
Singers from New York City
Carlton Records artists
RCA Victor artists
Decca Records artists
Singer-songwriters from New York (state)
Writers from New York City
20th-century American male writers
American memoirists
21st-century American male writers